The armpit effect in biology is a hypothesis that an individual learns to identify closely related individuals by their odor, comparing it to its own smell for phenotype matching. The animal is able to identify subtle genetic distinctions in odor, and this behavior enables an animal to distinguish between kin and non-kin. The theory was proposed by Richard Dawkins who hypothesized that it would be advantageous to an animal to be able to recognize its kin in this way so as to increase its fitness and reproductive success, an example being a mother's ability to feed her own offspring rather than those of another individual.

To test whether the hypothesis was true, experiments were performed on ground squirrels, cowbirds and golden hamsters. It was found that juvenile Belding's ground squirrels behaved differently when presented with plastic cubes rubbed with secretions from their relatives as compared to non-kin secretions. An experiment with chicks of brown-headed cowbirds provided evidence of self-referent phenotype matching, but in this case, a visual cue was used rather than an olfactory one. An experiment using young golden hamsters showed that they could recognise kin from non-kin even when, as infants, they had been removed from their mother at birth and reared by an unrelated female. In general, the armpit effect seems to exist and to be beneficial to the species concerned because it lessens the chance of inbreeding.

Background
The armpit effect is a form of ontogenic recognition, wherein an animal uses its own or another animal’s physical characteristics for recognition purposes. Under this behavior model, an animal uses its own scent to distinguish between kin and non-kin. The odors that an animal uses to compare itself to its counterparts are caused by differences in genetics. Although the scent glands that produce an animal's odor are structurally similar, these genetic differences cause different odors to be released. An animal's ability to identify subtle genetic distinctions based on unique scents is facilitated by the olfactory system in the brain. The armpit effect is crucial for an animal to increase its fitness (biology) and reproductive success.

Origin
The ability of an animal to recognize its kin can be the difference between life and death for a mother’s children. If she recognizes her children properly, she will give her children food and avoid feeding non-familial children. Richard Dawkins hypothesized that an animal had the ability to recognize kin and non-kin based on its own scent and defined this phenomenon as the ‘armpit effect.’
In an effort to find evidence for the ‘armpit effect,’ Warren G. Holmes and Paul W. Sherman conducted a three-year study on two species of squirrels: Arctic ground squirrels (Spermophilus peryii) and Belding's ground squirrels (Spermophilus belding).

Examples

Belding’s ground squirrels
An experiment was done where the offspring of captive female Belding’s ground squirrels were switched at birth. This created four classes of individuals: where siblings were reared apart, where siblings were reared together, where nonsiblings were reared apart, and where nonsiblings were reared together. After these offspring grew, the juvenile ground squirrels were placed in an arena in pairs and their interactions were observed. In most cases, animals that were raised together, if they were related or not, tolerated each other more. On the other hand, animals that were raised apart were observed to act aggressively to each other. However, biological sisters that were raised apart were observed to be in fewer aggressive interactions than nonsiblings reared apart. 
It was noted Belding’s ground squirrels have scent-producing glands by Jill Mateo. It was also noted that because of these glands, squirrels sniff the oral glands of other squirrels to acquire information and how the scents compare to the sniffers’ own scent. In another experiment, Mateo captured pregnant ground squirrels and moved them to laboratory enclosures. The juvenile offspring of the squirrels were observed investigating plastic cubes that had been rubbed on the dorsal glands of squirrels that were related to the youngsters in different ways (mother, grandmother, etc.). The juveniles had never met, and thus, had no prior experience with their relatives. However, if the juveniles knew what they smelled like themselves, then they should be able to accurately compare their own scents with nonrelatives and relatives. The length of time a Belding’s ground squirrel sniffed an object indicated its interest, and the results of the experiment showed that cubes that have been rubbed on relatives received a quick inspection. On the other hand, cubes that have been rubbed on nonrelatives received a longer inspection.

Cowbirds
In a set of creative experiments, the scientists dyed the feathers of 14 nestlings over a three-year period, using a nontoxic, permanent, black sharpie. The control nestlings had gray feathers which remained unchanged. The nestlings were then removed from the nests of song sparrows and eastern phoebes shortly after hatching and raised separately in visual isolation from all birds. The nestlings were then introduced to two adult female cowbirds, one which was painted, and one that was normal, before they molted. These introductions to the two cowbirds were the nestlings’ first visual encounter with other birds. It was noticed that as the trials progressed, the cowbird nestlings’ exhibited more and more “birdlike” behavior. It was noted that, as the birds became more social with each other, the painted young cowbirds approached the painted adults much more than they approached the non-painted birds. The cowbird nestlings showed the ability to inspect themselves, memorize certain characteristics and traits and seek out individuals showing those same characteristics to be social partners. This study was considered to be “the first evidence of self-referent phenotype matching through experimental manipulation of a recognition cue.”

Golden hamsters
In an experiment, newborn laboratory hamsters were separated from their mothers and siblings and placed them in the care of unrelated mothers and in the company of unrelated young hamsters. After seven weeks, female juvenile hamsters were presented a choice of flank-gland scents from a number of unrelated and related hamsters. In these seven weeks, these female hamsters were at a time when they would be choosing a mate, and thus, in nature, they would usually choose a mate that was unrelated to them. In the experiments, the female hamsters consistently chose unrelated strangers for a mate over unfamiliar siblings and foster siblings. Jill Mateo commented that the results were “remarkable” as the armpit effect was seen in a group of laboratory animals that were highly inbred and thus had very similar genetic makeup. However, the group still had enough genetic difference between individual hamsters to produce different scents. Mateo said “We never saw them sniffing themselves, but they certainly know what they smell like. Because of the way we structured this experiment, there is no other way they could have known the scent of their family. Any time you need to discriminate accurately among kind, this is the way to do it.”

Advantages and disadvantages
There are several advantages associated with the armpit effect.  The first advantage is that it prevents inbreeding.   Inbreeding could cause many problems such as infertility and an increased chance of recessive traits being passed on.  Another advantage is that it ensures that one is providing food and resources to family members.  
On the other hand, there are disadvantages to the armpit effect.  One disadvantage is that if the olfactory receptors are damaged, another animal or non-relative could be identified as a relative and it could cause harm to the individual.

References

Ethology